IWM may refer to:

 Imperial War Museum, British national museum organisation
 Information Warfare Monitor
 iShares Russell 2000, NYSE Arca symbol
 Integrated Woz Machine, Apple computer floppy drives
 Intelligent workload management of computing resources
 International Woman Master, now Woman International Master, chess titles
 Institut für die Wissenschaften vom Menschen ("Institute for human sciences") (IWM)